Musa ibn Bugha al-Kabir (died 877) was an Abbasid military leader of Turkic origin. Musa was the son of Bugha al-Kabir, one of the leading Turkish generals under Caliph al-Mu'tasim (r. 833–842). He may have participated in or at least organized the assassination of Caliph al-Mutawakkil in 861. Upon Bugha's death in 862, Musa succeeded his father in his offices and played an important role in the troubles of the "Anarchy at Samarra". Finally, he emerged victorious, and through his close association with the vizier and regent al-Muwaffaq, he became the most powerful general of the Abbasid Caliphate from 870 until his own death in 877. His sons Ahmad, Muhammad and al-Fadl likewise became senior military figures of the Caliphate, especially against the Zanj Rebellion.

Sources 
 
 

877 deaths
Generals of the Abbasid Caliphate
Abbasid governors of Jibal
Year of birth unknown
9th-century people from the Abbasid Caliphate